Primate of Normandy is a Roman Catholic title borne by the Metropolitan Archbishop of Rouen.

History
The title stems from the late Roman Empire: in the time of Constantine, the Romans across the Empire were evangelized. The evangelization happened chiefly in major provincial cities. During that crucial period in history, when Christianity spread throughout Europe, Rouen (la: Rothomagus) was the capital of the Secunda Provincia Lugdunensis. The city was evangelized in the early 2nd century AD. According to tradition, the first Bishops were appointed in Rouen later in the 3rd century. The first Bishop of Rouen about whom some details are known was Saint Mellonius (fr: Saint Mellon) in the early 3rd century.
The Bishopric of Rouen became an Archbishopric in the 7th century. The Primates were often established in former Roman provincial capitals. This rule applied to the Metropolitan Archbishop of Rouen.

Pope Callixtus III, by bulls dating from 22 May 1457 and 11 July 1458, reaffirmed the Archbishop of Rouen as Primate of Normandy. The jurisdiction extends over a land roughly corresponding to the borders of the former Secunda Provincia Lugdunensis to this day.

References

Catholic Church in France
Archbishops of Rouen
Roman Catholic primates